Bloomfield Township is a township in Polk County, Iowa, United States.

History
Bloomfield Township was established in 1856. It was then given the name Bloomfield from the many fruit orchards cultivated within its borders.

References

Townships in Polk County, Iowa
Townships in Iowa
1856 establishments in Iowa
Populated places established in 1856